David Brammer (born 28 February 1975) is an English former footballer. A midfielder, in a sixteen-year career he scored 22 goals in 455 games in the Football League.

Starting his career at Wrexham in 1993, he lifted the Welsh Cup and FAW Premier Cup with the club. He moved on to Port Vale for an initial £350,000 fee in March 1999. In 2001 he lifted the Football League Trophy, and was also made the club's Player of the Year. Following this success he was sold on to Crewe Alexandra for £500,000. He helped the "Alex" win promotion out of the Second Division in 2002–03. After three years with Crewe he switched to Stoke City in 2007, thereby becoming one of a small number of players to have played for the three local rivals of Crewe, Stoke and Vale. He spent 2007 to 2009 at Millwall, before finishing his career at Vale Park later in 2009.

Career
Brammer started his career at Welsh side Wrexham in 1993, under the management of Brian Flynn. He was on the fringes of the first team in 1993–94 and 1994–95, as Wrexham lifted the Welsh Cup after a 2–1 win over Cardiff City at Cardiff Arms Park. He was again a much used squad member in 1995–96 and 1996–97. He played 34 games in 1997–98, as the club missed out on the Second Division play-offs due to their inferior goal difference. He did however win the FAW Premier Cup with the club in 1998, after a 2–1 win over Cardiff. Following 41 appearances in 1998–99, he moved Port Vale on transfer deadline day for an initial fee of £350,000 – one of Brian Horton's first signings as Vale manager. The fee would late rise by £100,000 due to appearances clauses.

Brammer, whose father was born in Burslem, helped Vale to escape relegation from the First Division in 1998–99, as the "Valiants" finished above Bury on goal difference. He was handed the club captaincy for the 1999–2000 season, however he was unable to prevent Vale from being relegated. He had a poor start to his Vale Park career, but soon won round his detractors after some improved performances and some long range strikes on goal.

Brammer remained an important part of the Vale side in 2000–01. He scored 4 goals in 44 appearances, all of his strikes were key: he got the only goal at Colchester United in the league and salvaged a point against Millwall, and also helped save the club's blushes by scoring at non-league Canvey Island in a 4–4 FA Cup tie. Most significantly, he saved the Vale from defeat in the 2001 Potteries derby at the Britannia Stadium with an 81st-minute equaliser. He also led the team to Football League Trophy glory, in the final he was the man of the match, inspiring a 2–1 victory over Brentford at the Millennium Stadium. Fans voted him Port Vale F.C. Player of the Year at the end of the campaign.

In August 2001, he made the short journey to Crewe Alexandra, who paid Vale £500,000 for his services; manager Dario Gradi described him as "probably the biggest [signing] in our history." The sale was highly criticised by Vale fans. He suffered with hernia trouble towards the end of the 2001–02 season, though by July 2002 the club were relegated and he was appointed club captain. After close to fifty games in the 2002–03 Second Division promotion season, he struggled with injury the next season. In October 2003 he was hit with a groin problem, which required corrective surgery the next month. In all his pelvic trouble caused him to miss five months of the season, though he was offered a new contract upon his recovery. Gradi had hoped Brammer would sign a new contract with the "Alex", but after weeks of speculation, in July 2004 he chose a return to the Potteries to join Championship club Stoke City.

Brammer scored three spectacular goals in his time at the Britannia Stadium and was a key player for manager Tony Pulis in 2004–05, making 44 appearances. He made a further 45 appearances in 2005–06, though new manager Johan Boskamp complained that Brammer was less than prolific in front of goal. Pulis returned for the 2006–07 campaign, though Brammer played half of his 22 league games from the bench, and in January 2007 was allowed to sign for Millwall on a free transfer. He was instrumental in saving Millwall from relegation out of League One due to his steadying influence in midfield, however fell out of favour for the 2008–09 season.

He started training with former club Port Vale on 27 October 2008 to try to stay fit. He impressed manager Dean Glover and four days later Vale signed Brammer on a month's loan. On 27 November, the club announced that they would be extending Brammer's loan until January. After recovering from a knee injury, he was released by Millwall in January 2009, at which point he signed with Vale. He made fourteen appearances in 2008–09, however Vale chairman Bill Bratt informed him by voicemail that he would not be offered a new contract for the 2009–10 season. The 34-year-old intended to find another club, but never did.

Career statistics

Honours
Individual
Port Vale F.C. Player of the Year: 2001

Wrexham
Welsh Cup: 1995
FAW Premier Cup: 1998

Port Vale
Football League Trophy: 2001

Crewe Alexandra
Football League Second Division second-place promotion: 2002–03

References

External links

1975 births
Living people
People from Bromborough
English footballers
Association football midfielders
Wrexham A.F.C. players
Port Vale F.C. players
Crewe Alexandra F.C. players
Stoke City F.C. players
Millwall F.C. players
English Football League players